Originally mail from British Somaliland used postage stamps of Egypt, then India.  In 1903, about 30 types of stamps of India were overprinted "BRITISH / SOMALILAND".

First stamps 

In 1904 the protectorate issued its own stamps, featuring a profile of King Edward VII, and inscribed "SOMALILAND PROTECTORATE". Issues of George V used the same design with George's profile.

George VI 
After George VI ascended the throne, the new series of 12 values used three pictorial designs; a Berbera blackhead sheep, Lesser kudu antelope, and a map. The 1938 series included a 3/4 on portrait of the king; in 1942, with the restoration of civil postal service after the Italian occupation, new stamps used a full-face portrait, and the sheep design was re-engraved.

Change of currency 
Around 1950 the currency changed from annas and rupees to cents and shillings, and the 1942 stamps were appropriately surcharged.  The UPU 75th anniversary issue was printed in cents and shillings, but its issue date was 24 October 1949 (10th Oct. in London), before the changeover, so those stamps had to be surcharged in the old currency.

Queen Elizabeth II 

Queen Elizabeth II ushered in a new series featuring a variety of local wildlife and scenes. Some values of these stamps were overprinted in 1957 with "OPENING / OF THE / LEGISLATIVE  / COUNCIL / 1957", and in 1960 with "LEGISLATIVE / COUNCIL / UNOFFICIAL / MAJORITY, / 1960" to mark the events as named by the overprints.

All the stamps of British Somaliland were withdrawn from sale on 25 June 1960 as Somaliland obtained independence. For the week prior to formal unification with Italian Somaliland on 1 July, a set of Italian Somaliland stamps overprinted "Somaliland Independence 26 June 1960" was issued.

See also

 Postage stamps and postal history of Somalia
 Revenue stamps of British Somaliland

References and sources
References

Sources
 Stanley Gibbons Ltd: various catalogues
 Encyclopaedia of Postal Authorities
Rossiter, Stuart & John Flower. The Stamp Atlas. London: Macdonald, 1986. 

Philately by country
Philately of Somalia
British Somaliland
History of Somaliland